Peter Peterson may refer to:

 Peter G. Peterson (1926–2018), American businessman, author, and politician
 Peter John Eli Peterson (1887-1962), American farmer, businessman, and politician
 Harding Peterson (born 1929), known as Pete, American baseball player
 Pete Peterson (born 1935), American POW, US Congressman from Florida, and later ambassador to Vietnam
 Peter Peterson (Canadian politician) (born 1953), former Canadian Member of Parliament
 Pete Peterson (animator) (1903–1962), American motion picture special effects and stop-motion animation pioneer

See also
 Peter Petersen (disambiguation)
 Peter Pedersen (disambiguation)